Mirag Mahalleh (also Romanized as Mīrag Maḩalleh; also known as Mīrak Maḩalleh) is a village in Reza Mahalleh Rural District, in the Central District of Rudsar County, Gilan Province, Iran. At the 2006 census, its population was 138, in 39 families.

References 

Populated places in Rudsar County